Joseph Gaston Isabelle (14 November 1920, in Hull, Quebec (now Gatineau, Quebec) – 4 June 2013) was a Liberal party member of the House of Commons of Canada. He was a physician by career.

Isabelle was educated at the University of Ottawa and the Université de Montréal and went on to practice in Hull and Lucerne. He was mayor of Lucerne from 1961 to 1965. He was first elected in the 1965 federal election at the Gatineau electoral district. In the 1968 federal election, Isabelle campaigned in the Hull electoral district where he was re-elected in successive elections until the 1984 general election, at which point his riding was known as Hull—Aylmer.

Isabelle left federal politics in 1988 after successful re-elections in all successive campaigns. He served seven consecutive terms of office from the 27th through 33rd Canadian Parliaments.

He married Madeleine Sara-Bournet in 1946.

Electoral record

References 

1920 births
2013 deaths
Liberal Party of Canada MPs
Mayors of places in Quebec
Members of the House of Commons of Canada from Quebec
Politicians from Gatineau